Nirupedalu is a 1954 Indian Telugu-language drama film, produced by Donepudi Krushna Murthy under the Gokul Pictures banner and directed by T. Prakash Rao. It stars Akkineni Nageswara Rao, Jamuna, with music composed by T. V. Raju.

Plot
Narayana is young and energetic and leaves his village due to drought and reaches the city for livelihood but fails. Desperate Narayana faints up out of hunger when a rickshaw puller Ranganna gives him shelter. Ranganna is having a daughter Kamala and a son Ramu. Narayana and Kamala fall in love. Ranganna allocates Narayana a rickshaw by recommending to their owner Dharmayya. Now Narayana decides to work hard and buy his own rickshaw. So, he starts saving money at his owner Dharmayya, after completion of his saving Dharmayya double crosses and cheats him. Kasim and other rickshaw pullers protest against Dharmayya but because there is no proof no one can do anything. Angered Narayana wants to get his money at any cost, so, that night he enters into Dharmayya's house, tries to steal the money but he was caught and jailed. On the other side, Ranganna becomes sick and his position becomes worse. So, his son Ramu decides to run the house by boot polishing but on the double, he also meets with an accident and loses one limb. In that grieve situation, Kamala goes to Dharmayya for help and he tries to molest her when she is rescued by Kasim. Here Ranganna suspects Kamala's chastity and dies. Neighbors also attribute a taint to her when she becomes mad. At the same time, Narayana is released from jail when he arrives home, he learns that Kamala has gone to kill herself.

Cast
Akkineni Nageswara Rao as Narayana 
Jamuna
Ramana Reddy
Surabhi Balasaraswathi
R. Nageswara Rao  as Dharmayya
Chadalavada as Ranganna
Master Krishna Murthy as Ramu

Crew
Art: N. Krishna Rao
Choreography: Pasumarthi
Dialogues — Lyrics: Anisetty
Playback: Ghantasala, P. Susheela, R. Balasaraswathi Devi, M. S. Ramarao, Pendyala Nageswara Rao, K. Rani
Music: T. V. Raju
Story: K. Pratyagatma
Editing: G. D. Joshi
Associate Director: Rajnikanth
Cinematography: B. S. Ranga
Producer: Donepudi Krushna Murthy
Screenplay — Director: T. Prakash Rao
Banner: Gokul Pictures
Release Date: 2 March 1954

Soundtrack

Music composed by T. V. Raju. Lyrics were written by Anisetty. Music released on EMI Colambia Audio Company.

References

Indian drama films
Films scored by T. V. Raju
Films directed by T. Prakash Rao
1954 drama films
Indian black-and-white films